BBES may refer to:
 Bayou Boeuf Elementary School, a public school located in Lafourche Parish, Louisiana
 Broad Brook Elementary School, a public school located in Broad Brook, Connecticut